The Plymouth Pronto Spyder was a 2-door roadster concept that debuted in 1998, using a mid-mounted, turbocharged, 2.4 L, 4-cylinder engine and a five-speed manual transmission. 

Styled to recall European roadsters, the Pronto Spyder's bodywork used lightweight recycled materials, largely polyethylene terephthalate, or PET, over a steel chassis. The interior used spray-applied color, in red,  and a tortoise-shell steering wheel rim, subsequently used on the Chrysler 300C. 

To enter production, the concept would have needed to meet safety regulations, have better body stiffness (the A-pillar would need revision), suspension travel clearance for the wheelhouse, and rear-view mirrors, among other changes.

References

External links 
Allpar.com: Plymouth Pronto Spyder concept car

Pronto Spyder